Hogmire–Berryman Farm is a historic farm complex and national historic district at Spielman, Washington County, Maryland, United States. It dates from the late 18th or early 19th century, includes a brick house, an early 19th-century stone secondary dwelling, the ruins of a stone outbuilding, a stone root cellar, a brick privy, and a large stone end bank barn. The main brick farmhouse is a multipart structure showing initial construction from the first decade of the 19th century or earlier.

It was added to the National Register of Historic Places in 1980.

References

External links
 at Maryland Historical Trust

Houses in Washington County, Maryland
Historic districts on the National Register of Historic Places in Maryland
Farms on the National Register of Historic Places in Maryland
National Register of Historic Places in Washington County, Maryland
1890 establishments in Maryland